Northmount High School is a defunct English-language secondary school which was operated by the Protestant School Board of Greater Montreal in the Côte-des-Neiges area of Montreal, Quebec, Canada. It opened in 1957. It was later known as Shadd Academy. In its early years the school was predominantly Jewish, and later predominantly Caribbean.

References

High schools in Montreal
Defunct high schools